Kachemak Bay (Dena'ina: Tika Kaq’) is a 40-mi-long (64 km) arm of Cook Inlet in the U.S. state of Alaska, located on the southwest side of the Kenai Peninsula. The communities of Homer, Halibut Cove, Seldovia, Nanwalek, Port Graham, and Kachemak City are on the bay as well as three Old Believer settlements in the Fox River area, Voznesenka, Kachemak Selo, and Razdolna.

One interpretation of the word "Kachemak" is "Smokey Bay" which supposedly is from an Alutiiq word describing the smoldering coal seams that used to fill the bay with smoke.

Features

Kachemak Bay is home to Alaska's only state wilderness park, Kachemak Bay State Park. Kachemak Bay State park was the first state park in Alaska. There is no road access to most of the park; visitors must arrive by airplane or boat.

Kachemak Bay is also home to the Kachemak Bay National Estuarine Research Reserve, the largest reserve in the National Estuarine Research Reserve System. It is a very active site of research and education. The bay hosts a remarkably high level of biological activity, due in part to water circulation patterns which keep shellfish larvae and nutrients in the bay. While surface waters push nutrients out into the bay, ocean currents push them back into the bay, creating a very fertile environment. Both fish and shellfish are abundant in the bay, year-round.  Waterfowl and shorebirds occupy the bay during all but the winter season, while waterbirds and marine mammals including otters, seals, porpoise, and whales remain in the bay all year. The bay provides winter homes for 90% of the seabird and waterfowl populations of Lower Cook Inlet. Land mammals are frequently seen during the warmer seasons.  Moose, coyote, and bears are frequently seen.

The tides at Kachemak Bay are extreme, with an average vertical difference (also called mean range) of over fifteen feet (15.53 ft, 4.73m), and recorded extremes of over thirty-one feet (31.72 ft, 9.67m) as measured at the Seldovia Tide Station.  The highest tide on record is over twenty-five feet (25.25 ft, 7.7m) above MLLW and occurred on November 15, 1966.  The lowest tide on record is almost minus six and a half feet (-6.47 ft, -1.97m) from MLLW and occurred on April 27, 2002.

See also
Kachemak Bay Campus
Kachemak Bay State Park

References

Bays of Alaska
Bodies of water of Kenai Peninsula Borough, Alaska